The 26th TCA Awards were presented by the Television Critics Association. Dax Shepard hosted the ceremony on July 31, 2010, at the Beverly Hilton Hotel.

Winners and nominees

Multiple wins 
The following shows received multiple wins:

Multiple nominations 
The following shows received multiple nominations:

References

External links
Official website
2010 TCA Awards at IMDb.com

2010 television awards
2010 in American television
2010 in California
TCA Awards ceremonies